Balaleet is a traditional sweet and savoury dish popular in the Eastern Arabian cuisine.

A popular breakfast choice, it traditionally consists of vermicelli sweetened with sugar, cardamom, rose water and saffron, and served with an overlying egg omelette. It is sometimes served with sautéed onions or potatoes. The dish is especially served during the Islamic holidays of Eid al-Fitr as the first meal of the day.

See also 

 Sheer khurma
 Falooda

References 

Arab cuisine
Emirati cuisine
Qatari cuisine
Kuwaiti cuisine